Pennamma Jacob (10 February 1927 – 8 October 1998) was an Indian politician who served as a Member of Kerala Legislative Assembly from Muvattupuzha Assembly constituency from 1970 to 1977. She was an independent candidate.

Personal life 
She was born on 10 February 1927 as fifth child of her parents. She married P. T. Jacob who was a school teacher when she was 17. She was the mother-in-law of T. M. Jacob. On 8 October 1998, she died.

References 

1927 births
1998 deaths
Kerala MLAs 1970–1977
Women members of the Kerala Legislative Assembly